Manuripia is a fungal genus in the family Marasmiaceae. It is a monotypic genus, containing the single species Manuripia bifida, found in South America.

See also
 List of Marasmiaceae genera

References

External links
 

Fungi of South America
Marasmiaceae
Monotypic Agaricales genera
Taxa named by Rolf Singer